Hallucinogens are a large and diverse class of psychoactive drugs that can produce altered states of consciousness characterized by major alterations in thought, mood, and perception as well as other changes. Most hallucinogens can be categorized as either being psychedelics, dissociatives, or deliriants. However, others such as Fly agaric as well as other GABAergic hallucinogenics are more often considered to technically be hypnotics, therefore indicating another separate subcategory of drugs which can substantially alter visual perception.

Etymology
The word hallucinogen is derived from the word hallucination. The term hallucinate dates back to around 1595–1605, and is derived from the Latin hallūcinātus, the past participle of (h)allūcināri, meaning "to wander in the mind."

Characteristics 
Leo Hollister gave five criteria for classifying a drug as hallucinogenic. This definition is broad enough to include a wide range of drugs and has since been shown to encompass a number of categories of drugs with different pharmacological mechanisms and behavioral effects. Richard Glennon has thus given an additional two criteria that narrow the category down to classical hallucinogens. Hollister's criteria for hallucinogens were as follows:

 in proportion to other effects, changes in thought, perception, and mood should predominate;
 intellectual or memory impairment should be minimal;
 stupor, narcosis, or excessive stimulation should not be an integral effect;
 autonomic nervous system side effects should be minimal; and
 addictive craving should be absent.

Glennon's additional criteria for classical hallucinogens are that the drugs in question must also:

 bind at 5-HT2 serotonin receptors; and
 be recognized by animals trained to discriminate the drug DOM from vehicle.

Nomenclature and taxonomy 
Most hallucinogens can be categorized based on their pharmacological mechanisms as psychedelics (which are serotonergic), dissociatives (which are generally antiglutamatergic), or deliriants (which are generally anticholinergic). Some hallucinogens, however, such as salvinorin A and ibogaine, have pharmacological mechanisms different from those of all those categories. Entactogens and cannabinoids are also sometimes considered hallucinogens. Nonetheless, while the term hallucinogen is often used to refer to the broad class of drugs covered in this article, sometimes it is used to mean only classical hallucinogens (that is, psychedelics). Because of this, it is important to consult the definition given in a particular source. Because of the multi-faceted phenomenology brought on by hallucinogens, efforts to create standardized terminology for classifying them based on their subjective effects have not succeeded to date.

Classical hallucinogens or psychedelics have been described by many names. David E. Nichols wrote in 2004:

Robin Carhart-Harris and Guy Goodwin write that the term psychedelic is preferable to hallucinogen for describing classical psychedelics because of the term hallucinogens "arguably misleading emphasis on these compounds' hallucinogenic properties."

Certain hallucinogens are designer drugs, such as those in the 2C and 25-NB (NBOMe) families. A designer drug is a structural or functional analog of a controlled substance (hallucinogenic or otherwise) that has been designed to mimic the pharmacological effects of the original drug while at the same time avoid being classified as illegal (by specification as a research chemical) and/or avoid detection in standard drug tests.

Effects by type

Psychedelics (classical hallucinogens) 

Despite several attempts that have been made, starting in the 19th and 20th centuries, to define common phenomenological structures (i.e., patterns of experience) brought on by classical psychedelics, a universally accepted taxonomy does not yet exist.

A prominent element of psychedelic experiences is visual alteration. Psychedelic visual alteration often includes spontaneous formation of complex flowing geometric visual patterning in the visual field. When the eyes are open, the visual alteration is overlaid onto the objects and spaces in the physical environment; when the eyes are closed the visual alteration is seen in the "inner world" behind the eyelids. These visual effects increase in complexity with higher dosages, and also when the eyes are closed. The visual alteration does not normally constitute hallucinations, because the person undergoing the experience can still distinguish between real and imagined visual phenomena, though in some cases, true hallucinations are present. More rarely, psychedelic experiences can include complex hallucinations of objects, animals, people, or even whole landscapes.

A number of studies by Roland R. Griffiths and other researchers have concluded that high doses of psilocybin and other classic psychedelics trigger mystical experiences in most research participants. Mystical experiences have been measured by a number of psychometric scales, including the Hood Mysticism Scale, the Spiritual Transcendence Scale, and the Mystical Experience Questionnaire. The revised version of the Mystical Experience Questionnaire, for example, asks participants about four dimensions of their experience, namely the "mystical" quality, positive mood such as the experience of amazement, the loss of the usual sense of time and space, and the sense that the experience cannot be adequately conveyed through words. The questions on the "mystical" quality in turn probe multiple aspects: the sense of "pure" being, the sense of unity with one's surroundings, the sense that what one experienced was real, and the sense of sacredness. Some researchers have questioned the interpretation of the results from these studies and whether the framework and terminology of mysticism are appropriate in a scientific context, while other researchers have responded to those criticisms and argued descriptions of mystical experiences are compatible with a scientific worldview.

Link R. Swanson divides overarching scientific frameworks for understanding psychedelic experiences into two waves. In the first wave, encompassing nineteenth- and twentieth-century frameworks, he includes model psychosis theory (the psychotomimetic paradigm), filtration theory, and psychoanalytic theory. In the second wave of theories, encompassing twenty-first-century frameworks, Swanson includes entropic brain theory, integrated information theory, and predictive processing. It is from the paradigm of filtration theory that the term psychedelic derives. Aldous Huxley and Humphrey Osmond applied the pre-existing ideas of filtration theory, which held that the brain filters what enters into consciousness, to explain psychedelic experiences; Huxley believed that the brain was filtering reality itself and that psychedelics granted conscious access to "Mind at Large," whereas Osmond believed that the brain was filtering aspects of the mind out of consciousness. Swanson writes that Osmond's view seems "less radical, more compatible with materialist science, and less epistemically and ontologically committed" than Huxley's.

Dissociatives 

Dissociatives produce analgesia, amnesia and catalepsy at anesthetic doses. They also produce a sense of detachment from the surrounding environment, hence "the state has been designated as dissociative anesthesia since the patient truly seems disassociated from his environment." Dissociative symptoms include the disruption or compartmentalization of "...the usually integrated functions of consciousness, memory, identity or perception."p. 523 Dissociation of sensory input can cause derealization, the perception of the outside world as being dream-like, vague or unreal. Other dissociative experiences include depersonalization, which includes feeling dissociated from one's personality; feeling unreal; feeling able to observe one's actions but not actively take control; being unable to associate with one's self in the mirror while maintaining rational awareness that the image in the mirror is the same person. Simeon (2004) offered "...common descriptions of depersonalisation experiences: watching oneself from a distance (similar to watching a movie); candid out-of-body experiences; a sense of just going through the motions; one part of the self acting/participating while the other part is observing;...."

The classical dissociatives achieve their effect through blocking binding of the neurotransmitter glutamate to NMDA receptors (NMDA receptor antagonism) and include ketamine, methoxetamine (MXE), phencyclidine (PCP), dextromethorphan (DXM), and nitrous oxide. However, dissociation is also remarkably administered by salvinorin A's (the active constituent in Salvia divinorum shown to the left) potent κ-opioid receptor agonism, though usually described as a very atypical dissociative.

Some dissociatives can have CNS depressant effects, thereby carrying similar risks as opioids, which can slow breathing or heart rate to levels resulting in death (when using very high doses). DXM in higher doses can increase heart rate and blood pressure and still depress respiration. Inversely, PCP can have more unpredictable effects and has often been classified as a stimulant and a depressant in some texts along with being as a dissociative. While many have reported that they "feel no pain" while under the effects of PCP, DXM and Ketamine, this does not fall under the usual classification of anesthetics in recreational doses (anesthetic doses of DXM may be dangerous). Rather, true to their name, they process pain as a kind of "far away" sensation; pain, although present, becomes a disembodied experience and there is much less emotion associated with it. As for probably the most common dissociative, nitrous oxide, the principal risk seems to be due to oxygen deprivation. Injury from falling is also a danger, as nitrous oxide may cause sudden loss of consciousness, an effect of oxygen deprivation. Because of the high level of physical activity and relative imperviousness to pain induced by PCP, some deaths have been reported due to the release of myoglobin from ruptured muscle cells. High amounts of myoglobin can induce renal shutdown.

Many users of dissociatives have been concerned about the possibility of NMDA antagonist neurotoxicity (NAN). This concern is partly due to William E. White, the author of the DXM FAQ, who claimed that dissociatives definitely cause brain damage. The argument was criticized on the basis of lack of evidence and White retracted his claim. White's claims and the ensuing criticism surrounded original research by John Olney.

In 1989, John Olney discovered that neuronal vacuolation and other cytotoxic changes ("lesions") occurred in brains of rats administered NMDA antagonists, including PCP and ketamine. Repeated doses of NMDA antagonists led to cellular tolerance and hence continuous exposure to NMDA antagonists did not lead to cumulative neurotoxic effects. Antihistamines such as diphenhydramine, barbiturates and even diazepam have been found to prevent NAN. LSD and DOB have also been found to prevent NAN.

Deliriants 

Deliriants, as their name implies, induce a state of delirium in the user, characterized by extreme confusion and an inability to control one's actions. They are called deliriants because their subjective effects are similar to the experiences of people with delirious fevers. The term was introduced by David F. Duncan and Robert S. Gold to distinguish these drugs from psychedelics and dissociatives, such as LSD and ketamine respectively, due to their primary effect of causing delirium, as opposed to the more lucid states produced by the other hallucinogens.

Despite the fully legal status of several common deliriant plants, deliriants are largely unpopular as recreational drugs due to the severe, generally unpleasant and often dangerous nature of the hallucinogenic effects produced.

Typical or classical deliriants are those which block the muscarinic acetylcholine receptors (antagonism). These are said to be anticholinergic. Many of these compounds are produced naturally by plant genera belonging to the nightshade family Solanaceae, such as Datura, Brugmansia and Latua in the New World and Atropa, Hyoscyamus and Mandragora in the Old World. These tropane alkaloids are poisonous and can cause death due to tachycardia-induced heart failure and hyperthermia even in small doses. Additionally, over-the-counter antihistamines such as diphenhydramine (brand name Benadryl) and dimenhydrinate (brand name Dramamine) also have an anticholinergic effect.

Uncured tobacco is also a deliriant due to its intoxicatingly high levels of nicotine.

History of use

Traditional religious and shamanic use

Historically, hallucinogens have been commonly used in religious or shamanic rituals. In this context they are referred to as entheogens, and are used to facilitate healing, divination, communication with spirits, and coming-of-age ceremonies. Evidence exists for the use of entheogens in prehistoric times, as well as in numerous ancient cultures, including Ancient Egyptian, Mycenaean, Ancient Greek, Vedic, Maya, Inca and Aztec cultures. The Upper Amazon is home to the strongest extant entheogenic tradition; the Urarina of the Peruvian Amazon, for instance, continue to practice an elaborate system of ayahuasca shamanism, coupled with an animistic belief system.

Shamans consume hallucinogenic substances in order to induce a trance. Once in this trance, shamans believe that they are able to communicate with the spirit world, and can see what is causing their patients' illness. The Aguaruna of Peru believe that many illnesses are caused by the darts of sorcerers. Under the influence of yaji, a hallucinogenic drink, Aguaruna shamans try to discover and remove the darts from their patients.

In the 1970s, Frida G. Surawicz and Richard Banta published a review of two case studies where hallucinogenic drug-use appeared to play a role in "delusions of being changed into a wolf" (sometimes referred to as "lycanthropy," or being a "werewolf"). They described a patient whose delusion was thought to be caused by an altered state of consciousness "brought on by LSD and strychnine and continued casual marijuana use." The review was published in the Canadian Psychiatric Association Journal. While both central cases described white male patients from contemporary Appalachia, Surawicz and Banta generalized their conclusions about a link between hallucinogens and "lycanthropy," based on historical accounts that reference myriad types of pharmacologically-similar drug-use alongside descriptions of "lycanthropes."

Early scientific investigations
In an 1860 book, the mycologist Mordecai Cubitt Cooke differentiated a class of drugs roughly corresponding to hallucinogens from opiates, and in 1924 the toxicologist Louis Lewin described hallucinogens in depth under the name phantastica. From the 1920s on, work in psychopharmacology and ethnobotany resulted in more detailed knowledge of various hallucinogens. In 1943, Albert Hofmann discovered the hallucinogenic properties of lysergic acid diethylamide (LSD), which raised the prospect of hallucinogens becoming more broadly available.

Hallucinogens after World War II 
After World War II there was an explosion of interest in hallucinogenic drugs in psychiatry, owing mainly to the invention of LSD. Interest in the drugs tended to focus on either the potential for psychotherapeutic applications of the drugs (see psychedelic psychotherapy), or on the use of hallucinogens to produce a "controlled psychosis", in order to understand psychotic disorders such as schizophrenia. By 1951, more than 100 articles on LSD had appeared in medical journals, and by 1961, the number had increased to more than 1000 articles.

At the beginning of the 1950s, the existence of hallucinogenic drugs was virtually unknown to the general public in the West. However this soon changed as several influential figures were introduced to the hallucinogenic experience. Aldous Huxley's 1953 essay The Doors of Perception, describing his experiences with mescaline, and R. Gordon Wasson's 1957 Life magazine article ("Seeking the Magic Mushroom") brought the topic into the public limelight. In the early 1960s, counterculture icons such as Jerry Garcia, Timothy Leary, Allen Ginsberg and Ken Kesey advocated the drugs for their psychedelic effects, and a large subculture of psychedelic drug users was spawned. Psychedelic drugs played a major role in catalyzing the major social changes initiated in the 1960s. As a result of the growing popularity of LSD and disdain for the hippies with whom it was heavily associated, LSD was banned in the United States in 1967. This greatly reduced the clinical research about LSD, although limited experiments continued to take place, such as those conducted by Reese Jones in San Francisco.

As early as the 1960s, research into the medicinal properties of LSD was being conducted. "Savage et al. (1962) provided the earliest report of efficacy for a hallucinogen in OCD, where after two doses of LSD, a patient who suffered from depression and violent obsessive sexual thoughts experienced dramatic and permanent improvement (Nichols 2004: 164)."

Starting in the mid-20th century, psychedelic drugs have been the object of extensive attention in the Western world. They have been and are being explored as potential therapeutic agents in treating alcoholism, and other forms of drug addiction.

Legal status and attitudes 
In the United States, classical hallucinogens (psychedelics) are in the most strictly prohibited class of drugs, known as Schedule 1 drugs. This classification was created for drugs that meet the three following characteristics: 1) they have no currently accepted medical use, 2) there is a lack of safety for their use under medical supervision, and 3) they have a high potential for abuse. However, pharmacologist David E. Nichols argues that hallucinogens were placed in this class for political rather than scientific reasons. In 2006, Albert Hofmann, the chemist who discovered LSD, said he believed LSD could be valuable when used in a medical rather than recreational context, and said it should be regulated in the same way as morphine rather than more strictly.

The Netherlands previously allowed psilocybin mushrooms to be sold, but in October 2007 the Dutch government moved to ban their sale following several widely publicized incidents involving tourists. In November 2020, Oregon became the first U.S. state to both decriminalize psilocybin and legalize it for therapeutic use, after Ballot Measure 109 passed.

Effects

Relationship between long-term use and mental illness
No clear connection has been made between psychedelic drugs and organic brain damage. However, hallucinogen persisting perception disorder (HPPD) is a diagnosed condition wherein certain visual effects of drugs persist for a long time, sometimes permanently, although the underlying cause and pathology remains unclear.

A large epidemiological study in the U.S. found that other than personality disorders and other substance use disorders, lifetime hallucinogen use was not associated with other mental disorders, and that risk of developing a hallucinogen use disorder was very low.

A 2019 systematic review and meta-analysis by Murrie et al. found that the transition rate from a diagnosis of hallucinogen-induced psychosis to that of schizophrenia was 26% (CI 14%-43%), which was lower than cannabis-induced psychosis (34%) but higher than amphetamine (22%), opioid (12%), alcohol (10%) and sedative (9%) induced psychoses. Transition rates were not affected by sex, country of the study, hospital or community location, urban or rural setting, diagnostic methods, or duration of follow-up. In comparison, the transition rate for brief, atypical and not otherwise specified psychosis was found to be 36%.

Effects on the brain
Different classes of hallucinogens have different pharmacological mechanisms of action. Psychedelics are 5-HT2A receptor agonists (serotonin 2A receptor agonists).

LSD, mescaline, psilocybin, and PCP are drugs that cause hallucinations, which can alter a person's perception of reality. LSD, mescaline, and psilocybin cause their effects by initially disrupting the interaction of nerve cells and the neurotransmitter serotonin. It is distributed throughout the brain and spinal cord, where the serotonin system is involved with controlling of the behavioral, perceptual, and regulatory systems. This also includes mood, hunger, body temperature, sexual behavior, muscle control, and sensory perception. Certain hallucinogens, such as PCP, act through a glutamate receptor in the brain which is important for perception of pain, responses to the environment, and learning and memory.
Thus far, there have been no properly controlled research studies on the specific effects of these drugs on the human brain, but smaller studies have shown some of the documented effects associated with the use of hallucinogens.

Psychotomimetic paradigm
While early researchers believed certain hallucinogens mimicked the effects of schizophrenia, it has since been discovered that some hallucinogens resemble endogenous psychoses better than others. PCP and ketamine are known to better resemble endogenous psychoses because they reproduce both positive and negative symptoms of psychoses, while psilocybin and related hallucinogens typically produce effects resembling only the positive symptoms of schizophrenia. While the serotonergic psychedelics (LSD, psilocybin, mescaline, etc.) do produce subjective effects distinct from NMDA antagonist dissociatives (PCP, ketamine, dextrorphan), there is obvious overlap in the mental processes that these drugs affect and research has discovered that there is overlap in the mechanisms by which both types of psychedelics mimic psychotic symptoms. One double-blind study examining the differences between DMT and ketamine hypothesized that classically psychedelic drugs most resemble paranoid schizophrenia while dissociative drugs best mimicked catatonic subtypes or otherwise undifferentiated schizophrenia. The researchers stated that their findings supported the view that "a heterogeneous disorder like schizophrenia is unlikely to be modeled accurately by a single pharmacological agent."

Chemistry
Classical hallucinogens (psychedelics) can be divided into three main chemical classes: tryptamines (such as psilocin), ergolines (such as LSD), and phenethylamines (such as mescaline). Tryptamines closely resemble serotonin chemically.

See also
 Classical psychedelic
 Closed-eye visualization
 DOx
 Hallucinogenic plants in Chinese herbals
 Out-of-body experience
 Psychedelia
 Psychedelic experience
 Psychonautics
 Psychopharmacology
 Visual perception

References

Works cited

 Stafford, Peter. (2003). Psychedelics. Ronin Publishing, Oakland, California. .

Further reading 
The literature about psychedelics, dissociatives and deliriants is vast. The following books provide accessible and up-to-date introductions to this literature:
 Ann & Alexander Shulgin: PIHKAL (Phenethylamines I Have Known And Loved), a Chemical Love Story
 Ann & Alexander Shulgin: TIHKAL (Tryptamines I Have Known And Loved), the Continuation
 Charles S. Grob, ed.: Hallucinogens, a reader
 Winkelman, Michael J., and Thomas B. Roberts (editors) (2007).Psychedelic Medicine: New Evidence for Hallucinogens as Treatments 2 Volumes. Westport, CT: Praeger/Greenwood.

External links 

 Erowid is a web site dedicated entirely to providing information about psychoactive drugs, with an impressive collection of trip reports, materials collected from the web and usenet, and a bibliography of scientific literature.
 Multidisciplinary Association for Psychedelic Studies is a nonprofit research and educational organization which carries out clinical trials and other research in order to assess the potential medicinal uses of psychedelic drugs and develop them into medicines.
 PsychonautWiki is a wiki dedicated to documenting psychoactive drugs and their subjective effects, with an emphasis on hallucinogens and novel psychoactives. The site hosts experience reports, tutorials, and a curated collection of articles.

Hallucinations